The West Virginia Derby is an American Grade III stakes race for three-year-old Thoroughbred race horses run over a distance of  miles on the dirt at Mountaineer Race Track in Chester, West Virginia in August. The purse for the event is US$500,000.

History

The inaugural running of the event was 21 April 1923, the ninth race day at the newly opened Huntingdon's Tri-State Park.  Estimates put the crowd size at 10,000. Huntington's hotel rooms were so solidly booked that 50 people applied at the city jail for lodging. Tender Seth defeated six other entrants as the 6-4 favorite in a time of 1:54 3/5. In 1925 Tri-State Park renamed its premier event to the Huntington Derby over a shorter distance of  miles. On 17 April 1926 the event was renewed as The West Virginia State Derby and was won by Nine Sixty who defeated the inaugural Florida Derby winner Torcher by  lengths. Tri-State management were planning a rematch of between Nine Sixty and Torcher four days after this running but a catastrophe ensued with a fire engulfing the Tri-State grandstand on the morning of 20 April. The race meet was canceled and Tri-State Park was never rebuilt.

After a 32-year absence the event was renewed on 23 August 1958 at Wheeling Downs. The event was held three times at Wheeling Downs before being moved to Waterford Park in 1963. The first four winners of the event were all ridden by jockey Floyd Green and trained by local trainer Patsy Santo. Including two fillies, the 1963 winner Etimota who won by twelve lengths and Kerensa in 1966 who were sisters (Rico Monte (ARG) — Too Fussy out of Blue Sword). Both were bred and owned by Frances W. Luro, wife of legendary trainer Horatio Luro at their Old Mill Farm in Carterville, Georgia. Both in reality were trained by Canadian Horse Racing Hall of Fame trainer Frank H. Merrill Jr., but ran in the name of local trainer Patsy Santo.

The event has been run in split divisions twice - in 1972 and 1981.

The event was discontinued twice for lengthy periods in the 1980s and 1990s.

With influx of racino funds Mountaineer Park management was able to provide higher stakes and with that stability to the event in the 2000s.

In 2002 the event was classified as Grade III and upgraded to Grade II in 2009. However the event was downgraded back to Grade III in 2017.

In 2020 due to the COVID-19 pandemic in the United States, Mountaineer Park canceled the event.

Records
Speed record: 
 miles: 1:46:29 -  Soto  (2003) (Stakes and track record)

Margins:
12 lengths – Etimota (1963)

Most wins by a jockey:
 4 -  Floyd Green  (1963, 1964, 1965, 1966)

Most wins by a trainer:
 5 – Steven M. Asmussen (2005, 2007, 2009, 2012, 2015)

Most wins by an owner:
 2 – Mrs. Horatio Luro (1963, 1966)
 2 – Phil Teinowitz (1972, 1973) 
 2 – Buckland Farm  (1975, 1981)
 2 – Winchell Thoroughbreds (2007, 2014)

Winners

Notes:

ƒ Filly or Mare

§ Ran as an entry

‡ When the event was run between 1963 and 1981 the track was known as Waterford Park

† In the 1971 running, Captain Nash was first past the post but was disqualified for interference in the straight and Two Joy was declared the winner

See also
List of American and Canadian Graded races

References

Graded stakes races in the United States
Grade 3 stakes races in the United States
Horse races in the United States
Flat horse races for three-year-olds
Recurring sporting events established in 1923
Sports in West Virginia
1923 establishments in West Virginia